In surveying and construction, the laser level is a control tool consisting of a rotating laser beam projector that can be affixed to a tripod. The tool is leveled according to the accuracy of the device and projects a fixed red or green beam in a plane about the horizontal and/or vertical axis.

Development
The concept of a laser level has been around since at least the early 1970s, the original spinning-mirror design laser plane and line level was patented by the late 1980s, and the compact lens-based laser line level (as produced by many tool manufacturers today) was patented in the late 1990s. It was invented by Oscar Soliz in the late 1960’s, who later sold the rights to it.

Rotary laser level
A rotary laser level is a more advanced laser level in that it spins the beam of light fast enough to give the effect of a complete 360 degree horizontal or vertical plane, thus illuminating not just a fixed line, but a horizontal plane. The laser beam projector employs a rotating head with a mirror for sweeping the laser beam about a vertical axis.  If the mirror is not self-leveling, it is provided with visually readable level vials and manually adjustable screws for orienting the projector. A staff carried by the operator is equipped with a movable sensor, which can detect the laser beam and gives a signal when the sensor is in line with the beam (usually an audible beep). The position of the sensor on the graduated staff, also known as a grade rod, or story pole, allows comparison of elevations between different points on the terrain. Most laser levels are used in the construction industry.

Tower-mounted laser level 
A tower-mounted laser level is used in combination with a sensor on a wheel tractor-scraper in the process of land laser leveling to bring land (for example, an agricultural field) to near-flatness with a slight grade for drainage.

External links
 Laser leveling Resource conservation through laser leveling

See also
Dumpy level
List of laser articles
Laser Machine Control

References

External links
 

Construction equipment
Construction surveying
Laser applications
Surveying instruments

fr:Niveau laser